Fools Rush In is a 1946 comedy play by the British writer Kenneth Horne. It ran at the Fortune Theatre in London's West End for 237 performances between 2 September 1946 and 29 March 1947.

Adaptation
In 1949 it was adapted into a film of the same title directed by John Paddy Carstairs and starring Sally Ann Howes and Guy Rolfe.

References

Bibliography
 Goble, Alan. The Complete Index to Literary Sources in Film. Walter de Gruyter, 1999.
 Wearing, J.P. The London Stage 1940-1949: A Calendar of Productions, Performers, and Personnel.  Rowman & Littlefield, 2014.

1946 plays
Plays by Kenneth Horne
Comedy plays
British plays adapted into films
West End plays